The Tony Award for Best Revival of a Musical has been awarded since 1994. Before that time, both plays and musicals were considered together for the Tony Award for Best Revival. The award is given to the best musical play which has already appeared on Broadway in a previous production, or is regarded as being in the common theatrical repertoire. The award goes to the producers of the musical. Like Best Musical, songs from the musicals that are nominated for this award are usually performed during the ceremony before this award is presented.

Winners and nominees

1990s

2000s

2010s

2020s

Award records

Multiple wins
 2 Wins
 Anything Goes (First win was for the Tony Award for Best Revival in 1988)
 Company
 The King and I
 La Cage aux Folles
 Porgy and Bess (First win was for the Tony Award for Best Revival in 1977)

Multiple nominations
 3 Nominations
 Company

 2 Nominations
 Annie
 Carousel
 Fiddler on the Roof 
 Follies
 Grease
 Gypsy 
 Hello, Dolly!
 How to Succeed in Business Without Really Trying
 Jesus Christ Superstar
 The King and I
 Kiss Me, Kate
 La Cage aux Folles
 The Music Man
 Oklahoma! She Loves Me''

References

External links
 Tony Awards Official site
 Tony Awards at Internet Broadway database Listing
 Tony Awards at broadwayworld.com

Tony Awards
Awards established in 1994
1994 establishments in New York City